The Roman Catholic Diocese of Livramento de Nossa Senhora is a diocese located in the city of Livramento de Nossa Senhora (Bahia state) in the Ecclesiastical province of Vitória da Conquista in Brazil.

History
 27 February 1967: Established as Diocese of Livramento de Nossa Senhora from the Diocese of Caetité

Leadership
 Bishops of Livramento de Nossa Senhora (Roman rite)
 Bishop Hélio Paschoal, C.S.S. (1967.03.29 – 2004.01.21)
 Bishop Armando Bucciol (2004.01.21 – present)

References
 GCatholic.org
 Catholic Hierarchy

Roman Catholic dioceses in Brazil
Christian organizations established in 1967
Livramento de Nossa Senhora, Roman Catholic Diocese of
Roman Catholic dioceses and prelatures established in the 20th century